Bounding may refer to:

 Establishing limits on the behavior of a process or device, see Listing and approval use and compliance
 Bounding overwatch, a variety of military maneuver
 A cyclical type of jumping motion

See also 
 Bound (disambiguation)